KRK Uralets, or Yekaterinburg Sports Palace, is an indoor sporting arena located in Yekaterinburg, Russia.  It is used for various indoor events and is the home arena of the Avtomobilist Yekaterinburg ice hockey club.  The capacity of the arena is 5,545 spectators.

External links
http://krk-uralec.ru/ Official Site 
Venue information

Indoor ice hockey venues in Russia
Indoor arenas in Russia
Sport in Yekaterinburg
Buildings and structures in Yekaterinburg
Kontinental Hockey League venues
Avtomobilist Yekaterinburg